Matthieu Jost (born 8 January 1981) is a French former competitive ice dancer. With Pernelle Carron, he is the 2007 Skate Canada International bronze medallist, 2007 Winter Universiade bronze medallist, and 2008 Karl Schäfer Memorial champion. They placed sixth at the 2009 European Championships and ninth at the 2009 World Championships.

Career 
Jost began competing internationally with Roxane Petetin in the mid-1990s. They competed for three seasons on the ISU Junior Grand Prix series and placed 11th at the 2000 World Junior Championships. Petetin/Jost moved up to the senior level in the 2000–01 season. They last competed together at the 2004 European Championships, where they finished 12th. Petetin retired due to injury.

Jost teamed up with Pernelle Carron in the summer of 2005. They won a bronze medal at one Grand Prix event, the 2007 Skate Canada International, as well as bronze at the Winter Universiade and gold at the Karl Schäfer Memorial. Carron/Jost competed at three European Championships, finishing as high as sixth (2009), and placed ninth in their only appearance at the World Championships, also in 2009. Nationally, they were bronze medallists in 2006 and 2007 and silver medallists in 2008 and 2009. Carron ended their partnership in April 2009.

Jost teamed up with Olga Orlova later that year but their partnership was short-lived.

Personal life 
Jost is a computer analyst. His daughter with singles skater Vanessa Gusmeroli was born in the summer of 2009.

Programs

With Carron

With Petetin

Competitive highlights 
GP: Grand Prix; JGP: Junior Grand Prix

With Orlova

With Carron

With Petetin

References

External links 

 
 

1981 births
Living people
People from Sainte-Foy-lès-Lyon
French male ice dancers
Figure skaters at the 2007 Winter Universiade
Medalists at the 2007 Winter Universiade
Universiade medalists in figure skating
Universiade bronze medalists for France
Sportspeople from Lyon Metropolis